Triangle of Death may refer to:

Places
 Triangle of Death (Algeria), an area south of Algiers during the Algerian Civil War
 Triangle of Death (Iraq), a term applied by American and coalition forces, during the Iraq War, to a region situated just to the south of the Iraqi capital of Baghdad
 Triangle of death (Italy), an area in southern Italy with an unusual high number of deaths caused by cancer and other diseases, suspected to be caused by illegal dumping of toxic waste
 Triangle of Death, an area in Manchester, United Kingdom, notorious for its gang crime and violence; see Gun crime in south Manchester

Art, entertainment, and media
 The Triangle of Death (documentary), 2009 documentary about the Iraq War

See also
 Trauma triad of death, the fatal combination of hypothermia, acidosis and coagulopathy
 American death triangle, a type of rock and ice climbing anchor which magnifies load forces, making it prone to failure
 Danger triangle of the face, an area of the face from which infections can more easily spread to the brain
 Ukrainian Death Triangle, a concept in Ukrainian historiography